Innocent Udeme Udofot (born 2 May), better known as MC Galaxy, is a Nigerian singer and songwriter. He rose to fame after winning the Davido dance competition in 2012. He released a single (ALIONA) on his BIRTHDAY 2 May 2019. He has worked with Tspize, Swizz Beatz, Uhuru and Shizzi.

Music career
MC Galaxy currently runs his own record label, MCG Entertainment.

On 19 March 2014 he released his first single, "Sekem", under his label MCG Entertainment. A music video for the song, directed by Patrick Ellis, was released on 23 June 2014. The video went on to achieve over 4 million views on YouTube and a remix was released 2 years later featuring Swizz Beatz.

Discography

Albums
''Breakthrough ft Eke- abasi (2017)

Awards and nominations

See also
List of Nigerian musicians

References

External links

Living people
21st-century Nigerian male singers
Musicians from Calabar
Year of birth missing (living people)